Aruba requires its residents to register their motor vehicles and display vehicle registration plates. The island is one of the last jurisdictions in the world to continue issuing new plates each year rather than showing re-validation through stickers or other documentation.

The license plates have been changed annually since 1950. Only until 1958 the name "ARUBA N.A." was displayed on it. In 1976 the slogan "ISLA DI CARNAVAL" (English :"Island of Carnaval") was added. The slogan was changed again in 1983 to display "ONE HAPPY ISLAND". When Aruba became its own autonomous country within the Kingdom of the Netherlands in 1986, the name "ARUBA N.A." was changed to "ARUBA". Since 2011 the word "ARUBA" was changed to "aruba.com". The plate itself is valid for the first half of the year, and then a metal tab is added to indicate validity during the second half of the year. This tab is painted in the reverse color scheme as the plate and displays the same serial number as the plate.

From 2019 onwards the FE-Schrift or Fälschungserschwerende Schrift is used as the font for all vehicle registration plates of Aruba. Following this change in the font, the name "aruba.com" will be changed to "ARUBA.COM" in all capitals. This is the first time since 1993 that the licence plates have undergone a drastic change in the use of its font.

1931 to 1957
While license plates in Aruba may have been issued as early as 1924, few of these plates are known to exist.

1958 to 1975
In 1958 Aruba changed their license plate size to the North American standard plate size of 152 × 300 mm (6 × 12 inches). At the same time the words "ARUBA N.A." appeared at the top of the plate. Prior to 1958 the country name had not appeared on the plates. The long bolt slots introduced in 1960 allowed the use of 1/2 year validation tabs. Whether these tabs were issued from 1960 to 1963 is not known, but tabs for 1964 and all years since are known to exist.

1976 to 2003
In 1976 new license plates were introduced with the slogan "ISLA DI CARNIVAL" centered at the bottom. The year was simultaneously re-positioned vertically at the far right into two sets of numbers separated by a bolt hole. The slogan was changed again in 1983 to "ONE HAPPY ISLAND". After Aruba became a separate autonomous country within the Kingdom of the Netherlands in 1986, the N.A. in ″Aruba, N.A.″ (N.A. standing for Netherlands Antilles) was removed.

2004 to present
In 2004 the year of the license plate was moved to the left side, and it became hidden behind the semi-annual validation tab when the tab was placed onto the plate. This change allows the serial number to be moved farther to the right when five digit plates are used.

Type codes
The codes in the chart below are currently displayed as the first character in the serial number and identify the type of vehicle the license plate is registered to.

References

Aruba
Transport in Aruba
Aruba-related lists